The Castle of Santa Catalina  (Spanish: Baluarte de Santa catalina y Castillo) is a castle located in Cádiz, Spain. It was declared Bien de Interés Cultural in 1993.

References 

Bien de Interés Cultural landmarks in the Province of Cádiz
Castles in Andalusia